From 1960 to 1969, the United Press International (UPI) gave the annual AFL Player of the Year award in the American Football League, whose teams in 1970 became the American Football Conference (AFC) of the new National Football League (NFL).

From 1970 — following the AFL-NFL merger — until 1996, UPI then gave two annual player of the year awards. One was given in the National Football Conference (NFC) of the new NFL. The other award was given in the American Football Conference (AFC) of the new NFL. An AFC Player of the Year was named from 1970 through 1984, won each year be an offensive player. An AFC Defensive Player of the Year was named from 1975 to 1996, and an AFC Offensive Player of the Year, which replaced the overall player of the year award in 1985, was issued until 1996.

Winners

Multiple-time winners

See also
UPI NFC Player of the Year
United Press International NFL Most Valuable Player Award
American Football League Most Valuable Player Award
National Football League Most Valuable Player Award
NFL Offensive Player of the Year Award
NFL Defensive Player of the Year Award

References

National Football League trophies and awards